Kicking & Screaming is an American reality competition television series created by Matt Kunitz, David Shumsky and Mark Harris and hosted by Hannah Simone. The series premiered on March 9, 2017 on Fox. Kicking & Screaming did not return for 2017–2018 TV season, leaving it cancelled after one season.

Contestants
The cast is composed 10 teams of two, one member of the team being a professional survivalist and one being an everyday person. The show was shot in Fiji. The winning team at the end of the season split a $500,000 prize.

Contestant Progress

 The team won Kicking and Screaming.
 The team were the runners-up.
 The team won the prize challenge.
 The teams competed in a non-elimination challenge for a competition power. 
 The team competed in the elimination challenge and won, advancing to the next stage.
 The team withdrew from the competition.
 The team competed in the elimination challenge and lost.

Episodes

References

External links
 

2017 American television series debuts
2017 American television series endings
2010s American game shows
Television shows set in Fiji
Television shows filmed in Fiji
English-language television shows
Adventure reality television series
Fox Broadcasting Company original programming
Television series by Lionsgate Television